The Jones, later Probyn-Jones Baronetcy, of Rhyll in the County of Flint, was a title in the Baronetage of the United Kingdom. It was created on 28 January 1926 for the orthopaedic surgeon Sir Robert Jones. The second Baronet assumed the additional surname of Probyn. The title became extinct on his death in 1951.

Jones, later Probyn-Jones baronets, of Rhyll (1926)
Sir Robert Jones, 1st Baronet (1858–1933)
Sir Arthur Probyn Probyn-Jones, 2nd Baronet (1892–1951)

Notes

References
Biography of Sir Robert Jones, Bt, at Welsh Biography Online

Extinct baronetcies in the Baronetage of the United Kingdom